Intrusion tolerance is a fault-tolerant design approach to defending information systems against malicious attacks. In that sense, it is also a computer security approach. Abandoning the conventional aim of preventing all intrusions, intrusion tolerance instead calls for triggering mechanisms that prevent intrusions from leading to a system security failure. There are two major variants of intrusion tolerance mechanisms: mechanisms based on redundancy (e.g., as in Byzantine fault tolerance); mechanisms based on intrusion detection (e.g., with an intrusion detection system) and reaction.

See also
Byzantine fault tolerance

External links
Paulo Veríssimo, Nuno Ferreira Neves, Miguel Pupo Correia "Intrusion-Tolerant Architectures: Concepts and Design" 

Fault tolerance
Computer security